A. J. Manikannan is an Indian politician who is a Member of the Legislative Assembly of Tamil Nadu. He was elected to the Tamil Nadu legislative assembly as a Dravida Munnetra Kazhagam candidate from Ulundurpet in 2021 and also from Thirunavalur constituency in the 1996 election He contested the seat again in the 2001 elections and came second to K. G. P. Gnanamoorthy of the All India Anna Dravida Munnetra Kazhagam.He has been a loyal candidate of DMK and dispersed his duties in good will of the society.

Elections contested

References 

Living people
Tamil Nadu MLAs 1996–2001
Dravida Munnetra Kazhagam politicians
Year of birth missing (living people)
Tamil Nadu MLAs 2021–2026